Titcomb is a surname. Notable people with the surname include:

Brent Titcomb (born 1940), Canadian actor and musician
Everett Titcomb (1884–1968), American organist, choir-director, and composer
Gord Titcomb (born 1953), Canadian ice hockey player
Gordon Titcomb, American musician and composer
Jonathan Titcomb (1819–1887), English clergyman
La Belle Titcomb (born 1876), American vaudeville performer
Ledell Titcomb (1866–1950), American Major League Baseball player
Lesley Titcomb (born 1961), British civil servant
Liam Titcomb (born 1987), Canadian musician and actor
Margaret Titcomb (1891–1982), American librarian and writer
Mary Bradish Titcomb (1858–1927), American painter
Mary Lemist Titcomb (1852–1932), American librarian
Mike Titcomb (1933–2008), English rugby union referee
Sarah Elizabeth Titcomb (1841–1895), American genealogist and writer
William Holt Yates Titcomb (1858–1930), English artist

See also
Benaiah Titcomb House, built in 1700, is a historic house in Essex, Massachusetts
Titcomb Mountain, ski hill located in Farmington, Maine
Josiah Gilbert Holland, American novelist and poet who also wrote under the pseudonym Timothy Titcomb